Al Mashannah District is a district of the Ibb Governorate, Yemen. As of 2003, the district had a population of 101,148 inhabitants.

Uzal of Al Mashannah 
There are 3 ‘Uzal (sub-districts) in Al Mashannah.

 Al-huj Al-‘Uodani
 Anamr 'Asfal
 Al-Mashannah

References

Districts of Ibb Governorate
Al Mashannah District